Diebold is a surname, and may refer to:
Charles Diebold, founder of Diebold Safe & Lock Company, now known as Diebold Inc.
Clarence Diebold (1881–1964), American college football player at Notre Dame
Francis X. Diebold (born 1959), American economist
John Diebold (1926–2005), American pioneer of computing and automation
Laure Diebold (1915–1965), member of the French Resistance during World War II
Ulrike Diebold (born 1961), Austrian physicist
A. Richard Diebold Jr. (1934-2014), American anthropologist